Bettystown railway station was a railway station in County Meath, Ireland, on the Dublin and Drogheda Railway line, serving the village of Bettystown.

The station was opened on 25 May 1844 and closed on 1 November 1847.

References

Railway stations in County Meath
Railway stations in the Republic of Ireland opened in 1844
Railway stations in Ireland closed in 1847
1844 establishments in Ireland
1847 disestablishments in Ireland